The Rumpler D.I (factory designation 8D1) was a fighter-reconnaissance aircraft produced in Germany at the end of World War I. It was a conventional single-bay biplane with wings of unequal span braced by I-struts. It featured an open cockpit and a fixed, tailskid undercarriage. The upper wing was fitted with aerodynamically balanced ailerons and fuselage had an oval cross-section.

Design and development
The D.I had a protracted development through the course of 1917, with at least six development prototypes built before Rumpler settled on a final design in 1918 in time for the Idfliegs D-type competition at Adlershof. Two 8D1s participated, powered by Mercedes D.III engines. Another one participated in the follow-on competition in autumn, this time with a BMW engine.

Operational history
The Idflieg approved the type for production and issued the designation D.I, but only a small number were produced; the war was practically over and none saw operational service.

Variants
 7D1 - initial prototype with comma-style balanced rudder, wide-chord I-struts, and upper wing supported by pylon faired into engine cowling. The entire fuselage was skinned in plywood. The radiator was mounted in the upper wing, set off the port side of the supporting pylon.
 7D2 - identical to 7D1 but with vertical stabiliser added
 7D4 - similar to 7D2 with conventional struts in place of I-struts, conventional cabane struts in place of central pylon, radiator moved to wing centreline, and central fuselage skinned in fabric.
 7D5 7D7 - similar to 7D4 but with wing bracing again using I-struts (this time of narrow chord) and the bracing wires simplified. The flush-mounted radiator in the wing was replaced by ear-style frontal radiators on the forward fuselage
 7D8 - very similar to 7D7, with wire bracing simplified further (no landing wires at all)
 8D1 - final version approved for production as D I'''

OperatorsLuftstreitkräfteSpecifications (D.I)

References

Notes

Bibliography
 Gray, Peter and Owen Thetford. German Aircraft of the First World War. London: Putnam, 1962. 

 The Illustrated Encyclopedia of Aircraft. London: Aerospace Publishing, 1985. 
 Kroschel, Günter and Helmut Stützer. Die Deutschen Militärflugzeuge 1910–1918 (in German). Wilhelmshaven: Herford Verlag, E.S. Mittler & Sohn, 1994. . 
 Murphy, Justin D. Military Aircraft: Origins to 1918: An Illustrated History of their Impact.. Santa Barbara, CA: ABC-Clio, 2005. . 
 Taylor, Michael J. H. Jane's Encyclopedia of Aviation''. London: Studio Editions, 1989. .

External links

 Rumpler 7D 1, Experimental Single-seat Fighter Airplane

1910s German military reconnaissance aircraft
D.I
Single-engined tractor aircraft
Biplanes
Aircraft first flown in 1915